State Route 188 (SR 188) is part of Maine's system of numbered state highways, located in Penobscot County. It runs through three towns for the entire length: Enfield, Lowell, and Burlington. The route's western terminus is at SR 155 in Enfield. The route's eastern terminus is in southern Burlington near Saponac Pond where the road continues into the unorganized territory of East Central Penobscot as Grand Falls Road.

Major junctions

References

External links

Floodgap Roadgap's RoadsAroundME: Maine State Route 188

188
Transportation in Penobscot County, Maine